Amir Mustafa Rusli (born 5 February 1987, Kuala Dungun) is a Malaysian road bicycle racer. He competed at the 2012 Summer Olympics in the Men's road race.  Amir cycled for Drapac Professional Cycling from 2011-2012. He is now a coach for Malaysia Cycling Team.

References

Malaysian male cyclists
1987 births
Living people
Olympic cyclists of Malaysia
Cyclists at the 2012 Summer Olympics
Cyclists at the 2006 Asian Games
Cyclists at the 2010 Asian Games

People from Terengganu
Southeast Asian Games medalists in cycling
Southeast Asian Games gold medalists for Malaysia
Southeast Asian Games silver medalists for Malaysia
Southeast Asian Games bronze medalists for Malaysia
Competitors at the 2007 Southeast Asian Games
Asian Games competitors for Malaysia